Ganneruvaram is a mandal in Karimnagar district of Telangana state, India. It is a new mandal. It comes under Karimnagar Revenue division. Its headquarters are in Ganneruvaram village. It was formed by the Final Notification orders Issued. REVENUE (DA-CMRF) DEPARTMENT GO. Ms. No. 225: Date: 11.10.2016. It consists of 12 villages including Ganneruvaram village.

Villages in Ganneruvaram Mandal 

 Parvella
 Mylaram
 Shivapuram
 Gunkulkondapur
 Yaswada
 Sangam
 Madhapur
 Panthulu kondapur
 Gannervaram
 Gopalpur
 Jangapalle
 Cherlapur
 Gundlapally
 Peechupally

References

Mandals in Karimnagar district